Rüdnitz is a municipality in the district of Barnim in the state of Brandenburg, Germany.

Demography

Personalities 
 Friedrich von Bodelschwingh (1831-1910), pastor, founded the first dwelling Hoffnungstal Foundation Lobetal in Rüdnitz in 1905
 Kurt Kretschmann (1914-2007), conservationist, lived in time in Rüdnitz

References

Localities in Barnim